Doctor Ismail Reisli is an associate professor and associate chief physician at Selcuk University's Meram School of Medicine, in the Children Immunology and Allergy Department.

In 2006, he, along with other Turkish scientists, identified a new disease called “CD19 Deficiency”, which is caused by a deficiency in the body's immune system.

References

Turkish non-fiction writers
Turkish medical researchers
Academic staff of Selçuk University
Living people
Year of birth missing (living people)